Nathan Mabry (born 1978) is an artist based in Los Angeles.

Mabry was born in Colorado.  His work is a mixture of primitive sculpture and Minimalist-style art.  He references the work of artists such as Sol LeWitt, John McCracken and Carl Andre and uses materials including wood, plaster and clay.

Mabry took part in the prominent exhibition Thing: New Sculpture from Los Angeles at the Hammer Museum in 2005.

Mabry received his BFA from Kansas City Art Institute in 2001 and his MFA from UCLA in 2004.

Selected exhibitions
2000 - Filter Gallery, Kansas City
2004 - Supersonic, Windtunnel/Artcenter, Pasadena
2005 - Thing: New Sculpture from Los Angeles, Hammer Museum, Los Angeles
2006
Red Eye: Los Angeles Artists from the Rubell Family Collection, Rubell Family Collection, Miami
Nathan Mabry: Old Fashioned Fourth of July Celebration and Parade, Aspen Museum of Art
Cherry and Martin, Los Angeles, CA 
2007
Aspects, Forms and Figures, Bellwether, New York
Hammer Contemporary Collection Part II, Hammer Museum, Los Angeles

References

External links
Nathan Mabry on ArtFacts.net
Images, texts and biography from the Saatchi Gallery
Further information and collected press at Cherry and Martin

21st-century American sculptors
Kansas City Art Institute alumni
Living people
1978 births
Sculptors from Colorado